Fenglin Subdistrict is a subdistrict of Xinhua County in Hunan, China. The subdistrict was incorporated from a part of the former Shangmei Town on November 6, 2017. The subdistrict has nine villages and seven communities under its jurisdiction, its seat is Fenglinxincun Village.

Subdivisions 
Fenglin Subdistrict has nine villages and seven communities under its jurisdiction, as of its creation in 2017.

7 communities
 Huochezhan Community
 Wuliting Community
 Huaxin Community
 Shangtian Community
 Liaoyuan Community
 Xintian Community
 Ma'anshan Community

9 villages
 Xingyue Village
 Hongda Village
 Fengshuxincun Village
 Jielong Village
 Wanjiaqiao Village
 Dashuiping Village
 Xintang Village
 Huanglong Village
 Xiangrong Village from Sangzi Town

References

Divisions of Xinhua County